The following is a list of teams and cyclists that took part in the 2020 Vuelta a España.

Teams
The 19 UCI WorldTeams were automatically invited to the race. Additionally, the organisers of the Vuelta invited three second-tier UCI ProTeams to participate in the event.

The teams that participated in the race were:

UCI WorldTeams

 
 
 
 
 
 
 
 
 
 
 
 
 
 
 
 
 
 
 

UCI ProTeams

Cyclists

By starting number

By team

By nationality

References

2020 Vuelta a España
2020